A nipple is part of the breast, in anatomy.

Nipple may also refer to:

 Nipple or teat, on a baby bottle

Engineering
 Nipple (plumbing), a type of pipe fitting
 Spoke nipple, which binds each spoke to a bicycle wheel rim
 Grease nipple, used to put grease into a gearbox or moving part needing lubrication using a grease gun
 Nipple mouse, a pointing device on a laptop
 Nipple (firearm), in a percussion firearm, it is an extension of the touch hole to which a percussion cap is fitted.
 Nipple, on the end of a Bowden cable
 Nipple, the fifth wheel coupling kingpin on a semi-trailer

Music
 Nipple (album), a 1994 album by the Claw Boys Claw
 Nipples (Peter Brötzmann album), 1969

See also
 Nippes (disambiguation)